Colonel Bryan R. Klipfel was the superintendent of the North Dakota Highway Patrol from 2003-2007 and is a native of Ashley, North Dakota. He has been a member of the highway patrol since 1980. He is a graduate of the University of North Dakota (1975) and of the FBI National Academy (1987) in Quantico, Virginia.

External links
Bryan R. Klipfel bio website

Living people
State cabinet secretaries of North Dakota
University of North Dakota alumni
People from McIntosh County, North Dakota
American state police officers
Year of birth missing (living people)